Alma Township is located in Marion County, Illinois. As of the 2010 census, its population was 836 and it contained 374 housing units.

Geography 
Alma Township (T3N R3E) is centered at 38°41'N 88°52'W (38.689, -88.865).

Demographics

Adjacent townships 
 Kinmundy Township (north)
 Meacham Township (northeast)
 Omega Township (east)
 Iuka Township (southeast)
 Stevenson Township (south)
 Salem Township (southwest)
 Tonti Township (west)
 Foster Township (northwest)

References

External links
City-data.com
Illinois State Archives

Townships in Marion County, Illinois
Townships in Illinois